Christian Fuchs (born 7 April 1986) is an Austrian former professional footballer who played as a left back.

He began his senior career as a teenager at Wiener Neustadt before signing his first professional contract at 17 with SV Mattersburg, challenging for the Austrian Football Bundesliga title and taking part in European competitions. In 2008, he left for Germany, signing for VfL Bochum. After a season on loan at Mainz 05, he signed for Schalke 04 in 2011, where he contested the UEFA Champions League but suffered a serious knee injury. In 2015, he signed for Leicester, winning the Premier League in his first season at the club. After leaving Leicester in 2021 he spent one season with Major League Soccer club Charlotte FC.

A full international for a decade starting from his debut in 2006, Fuchs earned 78 caps for the Austria national team. He played for the nation at UEFA Euro 2008 and UEFA Euro 2016, captaining them for the first time in 2010 and on a permanent basis from 2012, before retiring from international duty in 2016.

Club career

Early career
Born in Neunkirchen, Lower Austria, his father was an amateur goalkeeper. He began as a forward at local team SVg Pitten before moving to 1. Wiener Neustädter SC at the age of 14. At the age of 15, while still an amateur and at mainstream school, Fuchs played for their senior team. When he was 17, he signed his first professional deal at SV Mattersburg, a team who despite coming from a town of 6,000 drew league record average crowds of 17,000, came third in the Austrian Football Bundesliga and played in European competition.

Prior to UEFA Euro 2008, he joined the German side VfL Bochum. He later described it as a useful move to play regularly while attracting attention from bigger teams. In 2010, he was signed on loan by 1. FSV Mainz 05, a newly promoted team who ended the season in the top five.

Schalke
On 6 June 2011, Fuchs signed a contract until 30 June 2015 with Schalke 04. The transfer fee is reportedly undisclosed by Schalke's sport and communications manager Horst Heldt. Fuchs was assigned the number 23 shirt, previously worn by Danilo Fernando Avelar.

In his time at the team from Gelsenkirchen, he competed in the UEFA Champions League, but suffered a long-term knee injury.

Leicester City

On 3 June 2015, Leicester City announced the signing of Fuchs on a free transfer, signing a three-year deal with the Foxes effective from 1 July. Signed under previous manager Nigel Pearson, Fuchs didn't have a regular spot in new manager Claudio Ranieri's squad until October. Fuchs made an appearance in Leicester's third round League Cup tie against West Ham United, providing an assist for Andy King's extra time winner. Following a 5–2 loss to Arsenal on 26 September, Ranieri elected to shake up his defensive back four, inserting Fuchs and teammate Danny Simpson in place of Jeffrey Schlupp and Ritchie De Laet, respectively. Fuchs made his first Premier League start the next week against Norwich.

In his first season, Leicester finished as champions on odds of 5,000–1, making Fuchs the first Austrian to receive a Premier League winners' medal since Arsenal's Alex Manninger in 1998. Following the insertion of Fuchs into the lineup on Matchday 8, Leicester City led the Premier League in clean sheets along with Arsenal, with 15. Fuchs himself led the league during this period in successful tackles with 77, while finishing second in interceptions with 98.

Prior to signing for Leicester, Fuchs had an offer to play in the United States, where his family live, but he turned it down. He said in March 2016, "My intention is to play in the US. I have come [to Leicester] for three years. I decided that I would sign one last contract in Europe, when I left Schalke, then go to the US."

On 21 October 2016, Fuchs signed a new contract with Leicester, keeping him with the club until June 2019. The next day, Fuchs scored his first goal for Leicester against Crystal Palace, volleying home a corner-kick clearance by Christian Benteke for the team's final goal in a 3–1 victory.

In May 2019 he signed a new one-year contract with Leicester. On 18 June 2020, Leicester announced that Fuchs had signed one-year extension.

On 21 May 2021, it was announced that Fuchs would be leaving Leicester at the end of the 2020–21 season.

Charlotte FC
On 7 June 2021, it was announced that Fuchs would join Major League Soccer expansion side Charlotte FC. On 27 July 2021, With Charlotte due to play MLS from the 2022 season, Fuchs joined USL Championship side Charlotte Independence for the remainder of 2021. After playing as a regular with Charlotte in their expansion season, Fuchs announced on 5 January 2023 he would be retiring from professional football.

International career

Fuchs made his debut for Austria on 23 May 2006 in a friendly match against Croatia, replacing Stefan Lexa for the final six minutes of the 4–1 loss at the Ernst-Happel-Stadion in Vienna.

He was part of the Austrian international squad as they co-hosted UEFA Euro 2008 alongside Switzerland. He made only one appearance in the group stage elimination, playing the entirety of the 1–0 loss to Germany in their last match of the tournament.

On 11 August 2010, in the absence of regular skipper Marc Janko, Fuchs captained his nation for the first time in a 1–0 friendly loss to the Swiss in Klagenfurt. That 17 November, he scored his first international goal, equalising in a 2–1 home friendly loss to Greece.

Fuchs received the armband on a permanent basis at the behest of manager Marcel Koller on 13 August 2012. He played all ten games as they qualified for UEFA Euro 2016, the first time they did so, and featured in every minute of the group stage elimination in France. Afterwards, he retired from international play with a total of 78 caps, declaring "I am very proud of the 10 years that I have spent with the national team. I did everything with passion and, as I said, I am very, very proud."

Coaching career
On 6 January 2023, it was announced that Fuchs would be an assistant coach for Charlotte FC for their 2023 season.

Personal life

Fuchs' wife Raluca Gold-Fuchs, with whom he has a stepson, son, and daughter, is a businesswoman formerly of Goldman Sachs. She lives with their children in Manhattan and Fuchs sees them once a month. He runs a public relations company and a football academy in the same city, and plans to move there permanently after his football career.

The Leicester Mercury described Fuchs as "not your stereotypical footballer...[he] has more strings to his bow than an orchestra". He is noted for his online video series "No Fuchs Given", a play on his surname and the English-language obscenity "fuck"; the series consists of himself and teammates doing unusual football-related challenges, such as him and Robert Huth shooting the ball as hard as possible at each other's backsides. He also has a stated dream to become an NFL placekicker and has demonstrated his skills on the BBC's NFL coverage. His surname "Fuchs" is the German word for "Fox".

Career statistics

Club

International

Scores and results list Austria's goal tally first, score column indicates score after each Fuchs goal.

Honours
Schalke 04
DFL-Supercup: 2011

Leicester City
Premier League: 2015–16
FA Cup: 2020–21

Austria U17
UEFA European Under-17 Championship third place: 2003

Individual
kicker Bundesliga Team of the Season: 2010–11, 2011–12

References

External links

Christian Fuchs – Official Website 

1986 births
Living people
People from Neunkirchen District, Austria
Austrian footballers
Association football defenders
1. Wiener Neustädter SC players
SV Mattersburg players
VfL Bochum players
1. FSV Mainz 05 players
FC Schalke 04 players
Leicester City F.C. players
Charlotte FC players
Charlotte Independence players
Austrian Football Bundesliga players
Bundesliga players
Premier League players
Austria international footballers
UEFA Euro 2008 players
UEFA Euro 2016 players
Austrian expatriate footballers
Austrian expatriate sportspeople in Germany
Austrian expatriate sportspeople in England
Expatriate footballers in Germany
Expatriate footballers in England
Footballers from Lower Austria
Major League Soccer players
Charlotte FC non-playing staff
Expatriate soccer players in the United States
Austrian expatriate sportspeople in the United States